Radley College, formally St Peter's College, Radley, is a public school (independent boarding school for boys) near Radley, Oxfordshire, England, which was founded in 1847. The school covers  including playing fields, a golf course, a lake, and farmland.  Before the counties of England were re-organised, the school was in Berkshire.

Radley is one of only three public schools to have retained the boys-only, boarding-only tradition, the others being Harrow and Eton. Formerly this group included Winchester, although the latter school is currently undergoing a transition to co-ed status. Of the seven public schools addressed by the Public Schools Act 1868 four have since become co-educational: Rugby (1976), Charterhouse (1971), Westminster (1973), and Shrewsbury (2014). For the academic year 2015/16, Radley charged boarders up to £11,475 per term, making it the 19th most expensive HMC (Headmasters' and Headmistresses' Conference) boarding school.

History 

Radley was founded in 1847 by William Sewell (1804–79) and Robert Corbet Singleton (1810–81). The first pupil was Samuel Reynolds, who in 1897 wrote his reminiscences of school life.

The school was originally housed in Radley Hall, now known as "Mansion". Radley Hall was built in the 1720s for the Stonehouse family. Later in the 18th century the estate passed to the Bowyer family, who commissioned Capability Brown to re-design the grounds. After the school was founded, extensive building work took place, beginning with Chapel (replaced by the current building in 1895), F Social and Octagon (the earliest living accommodation for the boys), Clock Tower, and in 1910 the dining hall (Hall). Building work has continued throughout the 20th and 21st centuries, with three new Socials, a weights-room/gym, a rowing tank, a theatre, and a real tennis court being completed since 2006. The Science Block was also expanded and refurbished in 2019. The grounds include a lake, a golf course and woodland.

On 31 August 2017, The Daily Telegraph reported that a whistleblower had suggested that teachers had helped their students in an art GCSE exam. Investigations by the exam board found no fault beyond a minor technical breach of exam regulations. Radley College issued a statement expressing full support for staff and procedures both within the art department and across the school.

On 6 July 2018, a plane trailing a banner reading "Make Radley Great Again" was flown over the school, in protest against Warden John Moule's campaign of modernisation. The £750 cost of the plane hire was raised by pupils at the school.

Price-fixing cartel case (2005)
In 2005 Radley College was one of fifty of the country's leading independent schools which were found guilty by the Office of Fair Trading of running an illegal price-fixing cartel which had allowed them to drive up fees. Each school was required to pay a nominal penalty of £21,360 and all agreed to make ex-gratia payments totalling three million pounds into a Trust designed to benefit pupils who attended the schools during the period in respect of which fee information was shared. In their defence, Jean Scott, the head of the Independent Schools Council, said that independent schools had previously been exempt from the anti-cartel rules applied to business; they were following a long-established procedure in sharing the information with one another and they were unaware of the current law.

School terms 
There are three academic terms in the year:

 The Michaelmas term, from early September to mid-December.
 The Lent term, from early January to late March.
 The Summer term, from mid-April to late June or early July.

Radley formalities 

Like Winchester, with its Notions, Radley has its own specialised terminology and formalities. For example, all teachers are referred to as "dons", and female teachers and members of staff are addressed only as "ma'am"; the headmaster is known as the "warden"; boarding houses are known as "socials", with their masters being known as "tutors" and their head prefects as "pups"; ties earned by pups, top sportsmen, and other distinguished boys have flat bottoms and are known as "strings" ("social strings" if earned for distinction within the social, "college strings" if earned for distinction within the wider college); and the five year-groups, from first to last, are called "shell", "remove", "fifth", "6.1", and "6.2". During the Michaelmas and Lent terms, gowns are worn over uniforms, while during the summer term, shirts are worn without ties, jackets, or gowns (known as "Summer Dress"). A formal house meeting is held once a week, known as "social prayers" (a mini-assembly usually with a talk or presentation); informal house meetings with food known as "cocoa" take place every evening; a weekend which a boy would usually stay in school for but has been allowed to leave on is known as a "privi" (short for "privilege weekend" as these can be cancelled if a boy is subject to disciplinary proceedings); and the final day of the academic year is known as "gaudy", from the Latin gaudē meaning 'rejoice thou!'

Socials 
There are 11 socials at Radley, each housing approximately 70 boys and distinguished by the colours of their members' ties. They are each known by a single letter, although they are formally named for their tutor (e.g. H, formally May's Social). When the college opened, most boys were living together in College, but they were under the care of six "social tutors" and the term "social" then referred to all the boys under the care of one tutor. When D Social was built in 1886 all the boys and their tutor were united in their own living quarters and so the word "social" came to mean the building and all of its inhabitants. Similar to Eton's houses and their dames, each social at Radley has a matron known as the "PHM" ("pastoral housemistress"), whose role is central.

Academic aspects

The school was inspected by the independent schools' Inspectorate in February 2008. The inspection report rated the school's standard of education as "outstanding", the highest rating. There was a subsequent inspection by ISI in 2013.

In 2012, the Independent review of A level results, based on government issued statistics, ranked Radley 31st in the UK, ahead of Malvern (32nd), Harrow (34th), Winchester (73rd), Tonbridge (74th), Eton (80th) and Wellington (89th) By 2019 they were still in the top 100 but had dropped to 75th place.

Sports

Sports played at the College are rugby football in the Michaelmas Term, hockey, rowing and football in the Lent Term and cricket, rowing, lawn tennis, and athletics in the Summer Term.

Other sports played include badminton, basketball, beagling, cross-country, fencing, fives, lacrosse, rackets, real tennis, rugby sevens, squash and water polo.

Rugby
Rugby is the major sport of the Michaelmas term. The school fields 23 rugby teams on most Saturdays of the Michaelmas term and on some Thursdays. The Master in charge of Rugby is Gloucester loose-head prop Nick Wood, OR.

Rowing

Radley is recognised for its rowing, having won events at Henley Royal Regatta on 6 occasions. Only Eton, St Paul's, Shrewsbury, and St Edward's have won more events at the Regatta.

Cricket
Cricket is played in the summer term. Some Old Radleians have progressed to play cricket for England or captain county level cricket teams. The cricket grounds (including Smithson Fields) have been described as 'arguably one of the best in the country' while the sporting facilities have been described as world-class.

Field hockey

Eighteen hockey teams are fielded during the Lent term. Teams train on three Astroturf pitches and a full-sized indoor hockey pitch. Radley takes part in the Independent Schools Hockey League.

Football

Twelve football teams are fielded in the Lent term. Radley competes in ISFA Southern Independent Schools Lent Term League. There is a yearly pre-season training camp before term starts.

Other sports
Sports such as fives, rackets, sailing, badminton, and polo are represented, as well as scuba diving. A real tennis court opened in July 2008, which made Radley the only school in the world to have fives, squash, badminton, tennis, racquets, and real tennis courts all on campus.

Southern Railway Schools Class

The school lent its name to the thirty-first steam locomotive (Engine 930) in the Southern Railway's Class V of which there were 40. This Class was also known as the Schools Class because all 40 of the class were named after prominent English public schools. "Radley", as it was called, was built in 1934 and was withdrawn in 1962. A nameplate from 930, Radley, is now displayed in the stationery department of Shop (the College's shop).

List of Wardens
 R C Singleton (founder) (1847–1851)
 W B Heathcote (1851–1852)
 W M Sewell (founder) (1852–1861)
 R W Norman (1861–1866)
 W Wood (1866–1870)
 C Martin (1871–1879)
 R J Wilson (1880–1888)
 H Lewis Thompson (1888–1896)
 T Field (1897–1913)
 E Gordon Selwyn (1913–1919)
 A Fox (1919–1925)
 W H Ferguson (1925–1937)
 J C Vaughan Wilkes (1937–1954)
 W M M Milligan (1954–1968)
 D R W Silk (1968–1991)
 R M Morgan (1991–2000)
 A W McPhail (2000–2014)
 J S Moule (2014–)

Old Radleians

Boyd Alexander, the African traveller and ornithologist
James Bachman, comic writer and actor
Merton Barker, cricketer and field hockey player
Richard Beard, prizewinning author of fiction and non-fiction
Harry Bicket, conductor
C. E. Bowden, pilot and pioneer of IC engined model flight and radio control
Gerald Brenan, writer
William Burdett-Coutts, producer, Assembly Festival
James Burton, conductor and composer
Richard Toby Coke, UKIP politician
Collingwood Tinling, builder of first jet engine
William Collins, author and cricketer
Peter Cook, comedian
 John Crabtree, lawyer and businessman; Lord Lieutenant of the West Midlands
Tim Crooks, Olympic rower
Jamie Dalrymple, cricketer
Norman Denny, author, translator of Victor Hugo's Les Misérables
Ted Dexter, cricketer
Cameron Tasker, rower
Alexander Downer, former Australian Foreign Minister and former Australian High Commissioner to the Court of St James
Mark Durden-Smith, television presenter
Marc Edwards, sports correspondent with BBC World News (formerly with CCTV International, France 24 and Eurosport)
Ivan Ewart, British naval officer and charity worker
Jeremy Flint, bridge player
George Freeman, Conservative Member of Parliament for Mid Norfolk
David Freeman-Mitford, 2nd Baron Redesdale, father of the Mitford sisters
Andrew Gant, choirmaster and composer
Richard Gibson, actor, best known as Herr Flick in the BBC series 'Allo 'Allo!
Nicholas Hannen, actor
Robert Hall, BBC Special Correspondent
Noel Harrison, English actor & member of the British Olympic skiing team in the 1950s
Simon Hart, Conservative Member of Parliament for Carmarthen West and South Pembrokeshire.
Alex Hearne, cricketer
Christopher Hibbert, historian
Cyril Holland, son of Oscar Wilde
Sir George Hollingbery, former Conservative Member of Parliament for Meon Valley and Her Majesty's Ambassador-designate to the Republic of Cuba
Charles Howard, 20th Earl of Suffolk, pioneering bomb disposal expert in the Second World War
Alan Huggins, Hong Kong judge
Charles Hulse, cricketer
Ben Hutton, cricketer
Jamie Laing, Reality TV in Made in Chelsea
Thomas Langford-Sainsbury, air vice marshal
Hugh Lindley-Jones, cricketer
Desmond Llewelyn, actor best known for playing Q in many James Bond films
Archie Friedrich Campbell, Marquess of Lorne, heir-apparent to the Dukedom of Argyll
James Lovegrove, SF novelist
Dick Lucas, evangelical Anglican preacher
Sir Edgar Ludlow-Hewitt, air chief marshal
James Charles Macnab of Macnab, soldier and chief of Clan Macnab
Sir George Mallaby, public servant, High Commissioner to New Zealand
Robert Marshall, cricketer
Sir Charlie Mayfield, CEO of Waitrose and John Lewis Partnership
J.X. Merriman, South African statesman
Harold Monro, founder of the Poetry Bookshop
Lord Charles Montagu Douglas Scott, admiral
Andrew Motion, poet and former Poet Laureate
Andrew Nairne, director of Kettle's Yard
Sandy Nairne, director of the National Portrait Gallery
Sir Christopher Nugee, Lord Justice of the Court of Appeal (England and Wales)
Edward Nugee, Barrister, Treasurer of the Inner Temple
Lt Gen Richard Nugee, British Army officer
Owen Paterson, MP and former cabinet minister
Ian Payne, broadcaster
James Pearce, journalist and presenter for BBC Sport
Edgar Prestage, historian and Portuguese scholar
Dennis Price, actor
Michael Reeves, film director
S.H. Reynolds, clergyman
Professor Sir Mike Richards, UK National Cancer Director
Lord Scarman, judge
Brough Scott, horse racing journalist, radio and television presenter, and former jockey
James Scott, cricketer
Tom Shakespeare, sociologist and broadcaster
Thomas Spyers, cricketer
Clive Stafford Smith, campaigning lawyer
Andrew Strauss, cricketer
Will Stuart, rugby player
Jeremy Stuart-Smith, High Court judge
Sir Reginald Stubbs, colonial governor
Lieutenant Colonel Rupert Thorneloe, killed in action in Afghanistan on 1 July 2009
Nigel Twiston-Davies, Cheltenham Gold Cup winning horse trainer
Charlie Wallis, cricketer
Peter Wildeblood, journalist and playwright and celebrated gay rights campaigner
Richard Wilson, Baron Wilson of Dinton, former UK Cabinet Secretary
Simon Wolfson, Baron Wolfson of Aspley Guise, CEO of Next plc
Major General Sir Edward Woodgate, who died of wounds sustained during the Battle of Spion Kop
Charles Worsley, cricketer.

References

Further reading

External links

Reviews and ratings
Profile at the Good Schools Guide

 
Private schools in Oxfordshire
Member schools of the Headmasters' and Headmistresses' Conference
Boys' schools in Oxfordshire
Boarding schools in Oxfordshire
Racquets venues
Real tennis venues
Educational institutions established in 1847
 
1847 establishments in England